Sotiras (before 1926: Σώτερ - Soter) is a village in Florina Regional Unit, Macedonia, Greece.

The Greek census (1920) recorded 327 people in the village and in 1923 there were 327 inhabitants (or 37 families) who were Muslim. Following the Greek-Turkish population exchange, in 1926 within Soter there were refugee families from East Thrace (18), Asia Minor (4) and the Caucasus (26). The Greek census (1928) recorded 137 village inhabitants. There were 48 refugee families (151 people) in 1928.

References 

Populated places in Florina (regional unit)

Amyntaio